William B. Fawcett (born May 13, 1947) is an American editor, anthologist, game designer, book packager, fiction writer, and historian.

Life 

Fawcett and fellow science fiction writer Jody Lynn Nye were married in 1987. They first met at a science fiction convention in 1985. At that time, Fawcett owned a gaming company in Niles, Illinois, and Nye began to work as a freelance writer for the company.

Career

Bill Fawcett was one of the players in early Dungeons & Dragons games being played in the Chicago and Milwaukee areas, using photocopied prototypes of the rules handed out by Gary Gygax. Darwin Bromley brought Fawcett on as a partner in Mayfair Games soon after the company was formed in 1980, and together they designed the game Empire Builder (1980). As a veteran role-playing gamer, Fawcett decided to get Mayfair into the RPG field, and the company kicked off its Role Aids game line with Beastmaker Mountain (1982). As a result of their connections with Mayfair, FASA was able to get a license to publish adventures (1982–1984) for Chaosium's Thieves' World role-playing game thanks to Fawcett's friendships with Robert Asprin and Lynn Abbey. Fawcett and Jordan Weisman designed the robot arena fighting game Combots (1983) for FASA.

Fawcett produced the Crossroads books (1987–1988), a set of licensed gamebooks published by Tor. He also authored the short-lived SwordQuest gamebooks series. He edited the book The War Years 1: The Far Stars War (1990). With David Drake, he co-edited The Fleet series (1988-1991), as well as its sequels, Battlestation, Book One (1992), and Battlestation, Book Two: Vanguard (1993). As a book packager, Fawcett arranged a deal between Wizards of the Coast and HarperCollins to publish novels set in Magic'''s multiverse of Dominia; the first of these was Arena (1994).

His 2008 book, Oval Office Oddities, was described as "Chock-full of information—trivia, anecdotes, charts, illustrations, etc." focusing on the lives of American presidents and their wives.

Works

Fawcett and Chelsea Quinn Yarbro write mystery novels together under the pen name Quinn Fawcett. Fawcett was also a field historian for the Navy SEAL museum in Fort Pierce, Florida, and has co-authored work on the US Navy Seals in Vietnam.

As writer
 Cold Cash Warrior: Combat Command in the World of Robert Asprin's Cold Cash War (with Robert Asprin) (1989)

Mistakes in History series
 Trust Me, I Know What I'm Doing 100 Mistakes That Changed History Men At War It Seemed Like A Good Idea How To Lose A War At Sea Doomed To Repeat How To Lose WWII How To Lose The Civil War Hunters And Shooters How To Lose A War It Looked Good On Paper Oval Office Oddities: An Irreverent Collection of Presidential Facts, Follies and Foibles You Said What? How To Lose A Battle You Did What? Mad Plans and Great Historical Disasters (with Brian Thomsen) (2004)

 SwordQuest series 

 SwordQuest: Quest for the Unicorn's Horn (1985)
 SwordQuest: Quest for the Dragon's Eye (1985)
 SwordQuest: Quest for the Demon Gate (1986)
 SwordQuest: Quest for the Elf King (1987)

Short-stories
 "Lincoln's Charge" (1992) (collected in Mike Resnick's anthology Alternate Presidents)
 "Zealot" (1993) (collected in Resnick's anthology Alternate Warriors)
 "Through the Dragon's Eye" (1994) (collected in Christopher Stasheff's anthology Dragon's Eye)
 "The Last Crusader" (1998) (collected in Harry Turtledove's anthology Alternate Generals)

As editorCrafter I (with Christopher Stasheff) (1991)Gods of War (1992)The Fleet anthology series (with David Drake) 
 The Fleet: The Fleet (1987) aka The Fleet, Book 1 
 The Fleet: Counter Attack (1988) aka The Fleet, Book 2 
 The Fleet: Breakthrough (1989) aka The Fleet, Book 3 
 The Fleet: Sworn Allies (1990) aka The Fleet, Book 4 
 The Fleet: Total war (1990) aka The Fleet, Book 5 
 The Fleet: Crisis (1991) aka The Fleet, Book 6 Battlestations anthology series — sequel to The Fleet anthology series Battlestation (with David Drake) (1992); aka Battlestation IBattlestation II (with Christopher Stasheff) (1993); aka Battlestation: VanguardBattlestations (2011); omnibus edition of Battlestation I and Battlestation IIThe Teams: An Oral History of the U.S. Navy SEALs with Kevin Dockery (1998)Making Contact: A Serious Handbook for Locating and Communicating With Extraterrestrials (1998)The Warmasters (2002)Masters of Fantasy (with Brian Thomsen) (2004)We Three Dragons: A Trio of Dragon Tales for the Holiday Season (2005)The Battle for Azeroth: Adventure, Alliance and Addiction in the 'World of Warcraft' (2006)Liftport: Opening Space to Everyone (2006)Nebula Awards Showcase 2010 (2010)
 

References

External links
 Bill Fawcett at The Encyclopedia of Science Fiction''
 Bill Fawcett at FantasticFiction – with cover images
 
  – with linked pseudonyms under which the library catalogs about 20 other books
 Quinn Fawcett (Chelsea Quinn Yarbro and Fawcett jointly) at LC Authorities, with 12 records, and at WorldCat

1947 births
American male novelists
American military historians
American mystery writers
American male non-fiction writers
Gamebook writers
Living people
Pseudonymous writers